Charles Neider (January 18, 1915 in Odessa, Kherson Governorate, Russian Empire - July 4, 2001, in Princeton, New Jersey) was an American writer, known for editing the Autobiography of Mark Twain and authoring literary impressions of Antarctica.

Movie
His 1956 novel, The Authentic Death of Hendry Jones, was freely adapted into the movie One-Eyed Jacks (1961) starring and directed by Marlon Brando.

Antarctica
Between 1969 and 1977, he participated in three expeditions to Antarctica funded by the National Science Foundation. and the United States Navy.

He wrote about these trips in "Edge of the World: Ross Island, Antarctica" (1974, dedicated to James F. Brandau and "Beyond Cape Horn: Travels in the Antarctic"(1980)

Neider's 1986 novel Overflight is based on an incident when Neider was a passenger in a helicopter crashed on Mount Erebus in 1971. The novel also concerns a plane crash with 256 passengers on board, so it is possibly a fictional combination of his 1971 experience and the 1979 Mount Erebus Disaster.

Mark Twain scholarship
Neider edited a major edition of the Autobiography of Mark Twain, published in 1959. In this, he expressed regret that Twain's daughter Clara Clemens would not permit him to include Samuel Clemens' dictations from June 1906 (the 19th, 20th, 22nd, 23rd, and 25th).

Other Mark Twain Publications he edited include:
 The Complete Short Stories of Mark Twain (1957)
 The Autobiography of Mark Twain (1959)
 The Complete Humorous Sketches and Tales of Mark Twain (1961)
 Mark Twain: Life As I Find It (1961)
 The Travels of Mark Twain (1961)
 Complete Essays of Mark Twain (1963)
 The Adventures of Colonel Sellers (1965)
 The Complete Travel Books of Mark Twain (1966)
 Mark Twain (1967)
 The Comic Mark Twain Reader (1977)
 The Selected Letters of Mark Twain (1972)
 A Tramp Abroad (1977)
 Plymouth Rock and the Pilgrims and Other Salutary Platform Opinions (1984)
 Papa: An Intimate Biography of Mark Twain by Susy Clemens (1985) 
 Adventures of Huckleberry Finn (1985)
 Mark Twain at His Best: A Comprehensive Sampler (1986)
 The Outrageous Mark Twain (1987).

Awards
 In 1977, he received a John Simon Guggenheim fellowship.

Personal life
He was married to Joan Merrick. He died on July 4, 2001, at his home in Princeton, New Jersey.

References

External links
 FindAGrave Memorial for Charles Neider, retrieved November 27, 2020. 
 IMDB Bio of Charles Neider (additional pictures)

City College of New York alumni
McMurdo Station
Scott Base
United States and the Antarctic
Explorers of Antarctica
1915 births
2001 deaths
People from Princeton, New Jersey
Writers from New Jersey
Russian and Soviet emigrants to the United States